Shahab-6 (meaning "Meteor-6", or Toghyân,) is the designation of an alleged  Iranian long-range ballistic missile project.

Capabilities
According to reports released in 1996, the missile has a range of about 14,000 kilometers, and its manufacturing technology comes from Russia and North Korea. According to these reports, the Shahab 6 missile was operational until 2014; And it is a completely redesigned model of North Korea's Taepodong 2 ballistic missile (Enkasasal-X-2). No reliable estimates of the Shahab-6's capability exist. According to Israeli intelligence, both the Shahab-5 and Shahab-6 would have a range of 8,500-10,000 kilometers. The Washington Times reported Israeli prime minister Benjamin Netanyahu as describing the Shahab-6 as having the capability to reach the US Eastern Seaboard.

Variants
Shahab is the name of a class of Iranian missiles, service time of 1988–present, of which three variants are confirmed: Shahab-1, Shahab-2, Shahab-3, while the Shahab-4, Shahab-5, Shahab-6 (Toqyān) were alleged to exist by Western and Israeli sources in the early 1990s but these allegations were not proven.

See also
Military of Iran
Defense industry of Iran
Equipment of the Iranian Army

References

 
 

Ballistic missiles of Iran